Awilo Longomba is a Congolese soukous musician. At first a drummer in Viva la Musica, Stukas, Nouvelle Generation and Loketo, he left drumming for singing and released his first album Moto Pamba with help from Shimita, Ballou Canta, Dindo Yogo, Dally Kimoko, Sam Mangwana, Syran Mbenza and Rigo Star in 1995. Awilo has performed live concerts in Africa, Europe, and North America, after first moving to France in the 1980s, 

Awilo's father Vicky Longomba was a founding member of Tout puissant OK Jazz, a Congolese rumba group.

Famous songs 
Karolina

Coupe Bibamba

Rosalina (Karolina Remix)

Mondongo 

Fidele

Discography 
 Coupe Bibamba (1999)
 Kafou Kafou (2001)
 Mondongo (2004)
 Super-Man (2008)

References

External links
Awilo Longomba Biography/Discography
https://web.archive.org/web/20110714042528/http://www.martinsinterculture.com/irawma-winners.html
http://nabtry.skyrock.com
https://web.archive.org/web/20061109045153/http://www.afrodicia.com/artist/awilo/index.html
http://www.africanmusica.com/awilo-longomba.htm
http://www.sternsmusic.com/discography/436
https://web.archive.org/web/20080101094243/http://www.africasounds.com/awilo.htm
https://web.archive.org/web/20100219074713/http://www.topvisages.net/entrevue/14-02-10.php
http://myspace.com/awilolongombaofficiel

21st-century Democratic Republic of the Congo male singers
Living people
1962 births
20th-century Democratic Republic of the Congo male singers
21st-century Democratic Republic of the Congo people